Ochtezeele (from Flemish; Ochtezele in modern Dutch spelling) is a commune in the Nord department in northern France.

The small river Peene Becque flows through the village.

The closest airport to Ochtezeele is Lille Airport (56 km).

Heraldry

See also
Communes of the Nord department

References

Communes of Nord (French department)
French Flanders